Banksia solandri, commonly known as Stirling Range banksia, is a species of large shrub in the plant genus Banksia. It occurs only within the Stirling Range in southwest Western Australia. Its scientific name honours the botanist Daniel Solander, one of the first collectors of Banksia.

Description
It is a woody shrub to 4 m (13 ft) high with large, broad serrate leaves and thick finely-furred stems. Flowering is in spring and early summer, the inflorescences are fawn in colour.

Taxonomy
B. solandri was first collected by William Baxter from the vicinity of King George Sound, and published by Robert Brown in his 1830 Supplementum primum Prodromi florae Novae Hollandiae. The name honors Daniel Solander, a student of Carl Linnaeus who accompanied Joseph Banks on the first voyage of James Cook, who collected the first specimens of Banksia to be scientifically described.

In 1847 it was recollected from Mondurup in the Stirling Ranges by James Drummond. The following year Drummond published the name "Banksia hookeri" for the species:  In 1856, this name was relegated to a synonym of Banksia solandri var. major, but that variety is no longer maintained, and B. hookeri is now considered a synonym of B. solandri.

Banksia solandri has always been regarded as most closely related to Banksia grandis in the series Grandes, and more recent molecular studies support this arrangement.

Cultivation
Banksia solandri is extremely sensitive to dieback, however it is easily grafted onto Banksia integrifolia. The foliage makes for an attractive garden shrub. It will grow with a sunny aspect and well drained soil.

Seeds do not require any treatment, and take 36 to 71 days to germinate.

References

External links

 
 
 

solandri
Eudicots of Western Australia
Taxa named by Robert Brown (botanist, born 1773)
Plants described in 1830